Henry Riley was a state legislator in South Carolina during the Reconstruction era. He represented Orangeburg County. He was one of several African American legislators expelled from the legislature toward the end of the Reconstruction period.

References

19th-century American politicians
Year of birth missing
Year of death missing
African-American state legislators in South Carolina